Tibati Madvolomafisha Nkambule (d. 1895), was the Queen Regent and Indlovukati of Swaziland from 1889 until 1894 following the death of King Mbandzeni (Dlamini IV). 

Tibati has been called "strong, traditionalist and well respected among her peers".  She led the country during the tumultuous period before the kingdom was placed under the administration of the South African Republic in 1894.

References

19th-century African people
19th-century women rulers
Women rulers in Africa
Queens regnant in Africa
Swazi monarchs
1895 deaths